Josef Pleticha (10 February 1902 – 6 January 1951) was a Czechoslovak footballer. He competed in the men's tournament at the 1924 Summer Olympics. At a club level, he played for SK Slavia Prague.

References

External links
 

1902 births
1951 deaths
Czech footballers
Czechoslovak footballers
Czechoslovakia international footballers
Olympic footballers of Czechoslovakia
Footballers at the 1924 Summer Olympics
Sportspeople from Kladno
SK Slavia Prague players
Association football midfielders